John David Currie (3 May 1932 – 8 December 1990) was a sportsman who played rugby union for England in 25 Test matches and also appeared in first-class cricket matches for Somerset and Oxford University. He was born at Clifton, Bristol and died at Leicester.

Cricket career
In cricket, Currie was a right-handed middle- or lower-order batsman. In 1953, at the disastrous Bath cricket festival where the first match, Bertie Buse's benefit match, was over in a single day, he made his first-class debut in the third game, against Leicestershire, scoring 4 and 13 in another match of feeble batting that was over well inside two days. He retained his place for the next match, a non-first-class game against the Royal Air Force, but those were his only appearances for Somerset's first team, although he played for the second eleven in the Minor Counties Championship up to 1955. In both the 1956 and 1957 seasons, he was at Oxford University and he was tried for the cricket team in several matches, but with little success. His highest score was 38, made out of a total of 95 in the match against Yorkshire in 1957. He had dropped out of the Oxford side well before the University Match in both seasons and so did not win a cricket Blue to go with the rugby ones. After leaving Oxford, he played second eleven cricket for Gloucestershire for a couple of seasons.

References

1932 births
1990 deaths
Aldershot Services rugby union players
Alumni of Wadham College, Oxford
Cricketers from Bristol
England international rugby union players
English cricketers
English rugby union players
Oxford University cricketers
People educated at Bristol Grammar School
Rugby union players from Clifton, Bristol
Somerset cricketers